Marcelle Géniat (1881-1959) was a French film actress.

She was born Eugénie Pauline Martin in St. Petersburg, Russia, to French parents.

Partial filmography

 Le retour du passé (1916)
 L'imprévu (1917) - Hélène Ravenel
 Serments (1931) - La baronne de Murnau
 La fusée (1933) - Marie Girbal
 Quelqu'un a tué... (1933)
 Le billet de mille (1935) - La rôdeuse
 Crime and Punishment (1935) - Madame Raskolnikov
 The Mysteries of Paris (1935) - La Chouette
 The Green Domino (1935) - Mme de Fallec
 La Garçonne (1936) - Tante Sylvestre
 They Were Five (1936) - La grand' mère
 La joueuse d'orgue (1936) - Véronique
 The Man of the Hour (1937) - Alphonsine Boulard - la mère d'Alfred
 La Glu (1938) - Marie des Anges
 The Strange Monsieur Victor (1938) - La mère de Victor
 Satan's Paradise (1938) - La marquise d'Amaral
 Crossroads (1938) - Mme. Pelletier
 Le révolté (1938) - La grand-mère
 L'étrange nuit de Noël (1939) - Madame Thibet
 Quartier latin (1939) - (uncredited)
 Le chemin de l'honneur (1940) - Mme Imbert
 Fromont jeune et Risler aîné (1941) - Madame Delobelle
 Le briseur de chaînes (1941) - Mamouret
 The Blue Veil (1942) - Madame Breuilly
 Haut le vent (1942) - Tante Anna
 Les ailes blanches (1943) - Tante Louise
 The Wolf of the Malveneurs (1943) - Marianne
 Jeannou (1943) - Marceline
 The White Waltz (1943) - Nany
 Sowing the Wind (1944)
 Le merle blanc (1944) - Noémie
 The Last Metro (1945)
 Destins (1946) - Mme Moretti
 The Village of Wrath (1947) - La grand-mère
 Les requins de Gibraltar (1947) - Tante Marguerite
 La renégate (1948) - La sorcière, sa femme
 Une mort sans importance (1948) - Tante Agathe
 Night Round (1950) - La locataire du sixième
 La belle que voilà (1950) - Varbara Ostovska
 Blonde (1950) - La grand-mère
 God Needs Men (1950) - La mère Gourvennec
 The Man from Jamaica (1950) - Mme. Milleris
 The Passerby (1951) - Mme. Iturbe
 Procès au Vatican (1952) - Soeur Saint-Pierre
 The Secret of the Mountain Lake (1952)
 The Girl with the Whip (1952) - Madame Pons
 Manon des sources (1952) - Baptistine, la Piémontaise
 The Unfrocked One (1954) - Madame Morand
 Girl on the Third Floor (1955) - Mme Gretchikine
 Bonjour jeunesse (1957) - La grand-mère de Pietro (final film role)

References

Bibliography 
 Goble, Alan. The Complete Index to Literary Sources in Film. Walter de Gruyter, 1999.

External links 
 

1881 births
1959 deaths
French film actresses
French silent film actresses
20th-century French actresses
French expatriates in the Russian Empire